Lost and Safe is the third studio album by American musical duo The Books. It was released on April 5, 2005 by Tomlab. As with the duo's prior records, Lost and Sound features extensive sampling.

Composition
Lost and Safe is stylistically similar to previous Books albums, continuing the duo's rich use of samples. The samples used on Lost and Safe originate from sources as diverse as Raymond Baxter ("That's the picture. You s—you see it for yourself."), W. H. Auden ("This great society is going smash / A culture is no better than its woods", from his poem "Woods"), and a reading of Lewis Carroll's poem "Jabberwocky". "Venice" samples the bonus track of a 1966 opera record, on which an American reporter describes a Salvador Dalí "happening" in Venice. The eclecticism of the samples is partially owed to their origins in used "bargain bin" records. Throughout the album, these direct samples are juxtaposed with interpolated vocal passages performed by Books member Nick Zammuto. The Books opted to employ more linear song structures on Lost and Safe, with the intent of composing material more well suited to live performance.

Critical reception

Lost and Safe received highly positive reviews from music critics. On the review aggregation website Metacritic, the album has a rating of 84 out of 100, indicating "universal acclaim". David Serra of AllMusic wrote: "From the songwriting to the production to the performance, the whole package that the Books present with Lost and Safe works wonderfully and makes for a very rewarding listen." The Wire named Lost and Safe the best album of 2005.

Track listing

Personnel
Credits are adapted from the liner notes of the 2005 and 2011 issues of the album.

The Books
 Paul de Jong – music, mastering, mixing, recording
 Nick Zammuto – music, mastering, mixing, recording

Additional personnel
 Frieda Luczak – design

References

External links
 
 

2005 albums
The Books albums
Albums recorded in a home studio
Tomlab albums